Amundsen is a Norwegian surname. Amundsen literally means son of Amund. Notable people with this surname include the following:

Arthur Amundsen (1886–1936), Norwegian gymnast who competed in the 1908 and 1912 Summer Olympics
Asle Amundsen (born 1952), Norwegian politician for the Socialist Left Party 
Carl Morten Amundsen (born 1961), Norwegian dramaturge and theatre director 
Harald Amundsen (born 1962), Norwegian sprint canoer 
Jan Tore Amundsen (born 1983), Norwegian football midfielder 
Marius Amundsen (born 1992), Norwegian footballer
Mauritz Amundsen (1904–1982), Norwegian Olympic sport shooter 
Monte Amundsen (1930-2011), American opera and musical singer 
Olaf Amundsen (1876–1939), Norwegian politician for the Liberal Party 
Per-Willy Amundsen (born 1971), Norwegian politician and MP for the Progress Party 
Roald Amundsen (1872–1928), Norwegian explorer of the polar region 
Steinar Amundsen (1945–2022), Norwegian sprint canoer who competed in the 1968 Summer Olympics

Norwegian-language surnames
Patronymic surnames
Surnames from given names